Windows 10 May 2020 Update (also known as version 2004 and codenamed "20H1") is the ninth major update to Windows 10. It carries the build number 10.0.19041.

Version history
The first preview was released to Insiders who opted in to the exclusive Skip Ahead ring on February 14, 2019. The update began rolling out on May 27, 2020.
Notable changes in the May 2020 Update include:

Faster and easier access to Bluetooth settings and pairing
Improved Kaomojis
Virtual Desktops are now renamable 
DirectX 12 Ultimate
Introducing a chat-based UI for Cortana
Greater integration with Android smartphones on the Your Phone app
Windows Subsystem for Linux 2 (WSL 2)
Ability to use Windows Hello without the need for a password
Ability to use Windows Hello PIN while in safe mode
Cloud download option to reset Windows
Accessibility improvements

The update reached end of service after the release of build 19041.1415 on December 14, 2021.

See also
Windows 10 version history

References

Windows 10
History of Microsoft
Software version histories